In mathematics, the tensor algebra of a vector space V, denoted T(V) or T(V), is the algebra of tensors on V (of any rank) with multiplication being the tensor product. It is the free algebra on V, in the sense of being left adjoint to the forgetful functor from algebras to vector spaces: it is the "most general" algebra containing V, in the sense of the corresponding universal property (see below).

The tensor algebra is important because many other algebras arise as quotient algebras of T(V).  These include the exterior algebra, the symmetric algebra, Clifford algebras, the Weyl algebra and universal enveloping algebras.

The tensor algebra also has two coalgebra structures; one simple one, which does not make it a bialgebra, but does lead to the concept of a cofree coalgebra, and a more complicated one, which yields a bialgebra, and can be extended by giving an antipode to create a Hopf algebra structure.

Note: In this article, all algebras are assumed to be unital and associative. The unit is explicitly required to define the coproduct.

Construction
Let V be a vector space over a field K. For any nonnegative integer k, we define the kth tensor power of V to be the tensor product of V with itself k times:

That is, TkV consists of all tensors on V of order k. By convention T0V is the ground field K (as a one-dimensional vector space over itself).

We then construct T(V) as the direct sum of TkV for k = 0,1,2,…

The multiplication in T(V) is determined by the canonical isomorphism

given by the tensor product, which is then extended by linearity to all of T(V). This multiplication rule implies that the tensor algebra T(V) is naturally a graded algebra with TkV serving as the grade-k subspace. This grading can be extended to a Z grading by appending subspaces  for negative integers k.

The construction generalizes in a straightforward manner to the tensor algebra of any module M over a commutative ring. If R is a non-commutative ring, one can still perform the construction for any R-R bimodule M. (It does not work for ordinary R-modules because the iterated tensor products cannot be formed.)

Adjunction and universal property
The tensor algebra  is also called the free algebra on the vector space , and is functorial; this means that the map  extends to linear maps for forming a functor from the category of -vector spaces to the category of associative algebra. Similarly with other free constructions, the functor  is left adjoint to the forgetful functor  that sends each associative -algebra to its underlying vector space.

Explicitly, the tensor algebra satisfies the following universal property, which formally expresses the statement that it is the most general algebra containing V:

Here  is the canonical inclusion of  into . As for other universal properties, the tensor algebra  can be defined as the unique algebra satisfying this property (specifically, it is unique up to a unique isomorphism), but this definition requires to prove that an object satisfying this property exists.

Non-commutative polynomials
If V has finite dimension n, another way of looking at the tensor algebra is as the "algebra of polynomials over K in n non-commuting variables". If we take basis vectors for V, those become non-commuting variables (or indeterminates) in T(V), subject to no constraints beyond associativity, the distributive law and K-linearity.

Quotients

Because of the generality of the tensor algebra, many other algebras of interest can be constructed by starting with the tensor algebra and then imposing certain relations on the generators, i.e. by constructing certain quotient algebras of T(V).  Examples of this are the exterior algebra, the symmetric algebra, Clifford algebras, the Weyl algebra and universal enveloping algebras.

Coalgebra
The tensor algebra has two different coalgebra structures. One is compatible with the tensor product, and thus can be extended to a bialgebra, and can be further be extended with an antipode to a Hopf algebra structure. The other structure, although simpler, cannot be extended to a bialgebra. The first structure is developed immediately below; the second structure is given in the section on the cofree coalgebra, further down.

The development provided below can be equally well applied to the exterior algebra, using the wedge symbol  in place of the tensor symbol ; a sign must also be kept track of, when permuting elements of the exterior algebra. This correspondence also lasts through the definition of the bialgebra, and on to the definition of a Hopf algebra. That is, the exterior algebra can also be given a Hopf algebra structure.

Similarly, the symmetric algebra can also be given the structure of a Hopf algebra, in exactly the same fashion, by replacing everywhere the tensor product  by the symmetrized tensor product , i.e. that product where 

In each case, this is possible because the alternating product  and the symmetric product  obey the required consistency conditions for the definition of a bialgebra and Hopf algebra; this can be explicitly checked in the manner below. Whenever one has a product obeying these consistency conditions, the construction goes through; insofar as such a product gave rise to a quotient space, the quotient space inherits the Hopf algebra structure.

In the language of category theory, one says that there is a functor  from the category of -vector spaces to the category of -associate algebras. But there is also a functor  taking vector spaces to the category of exterior algebras, and a functor  taking vector spaces to symmetric algebras. Verifying that quotienting preserves the Hopf algebra structure is the same as verifying that the maps are indeed natural.

Coproduct 
The coalgebra is obtained by defining a coproduct or diagonal operator

The  symbol is used to denote the "external" tensor product, needed for the definition of a coalgebra. It is being used to distinguish it from the "internal" tensor product , which is already being used to denote multiplication in the tensor algebra (see the section Multiplication, below, for further clarification on this issue). In order to avoid confusion between these two symbols, most texts will replace  by a plain dot, or even drop it altogether, with the understanding that it is implied from context. This then allows the  symbol to be used in place of the  symbol. This is not done below, and the two symbols are used independently and explicitly, so as to show the proper location of each. The result is a bit more verbose, but should be easier to comprehend.

The definition of the operator  is most easily built up in stages, first by defining it for elements  and then by homomorphically extending it to the whole algebra.  A suitable choice for the coproduct is then

and

where  is the unit of the field . By linearity, one obviously has

for all  It is straightforward to verify that this definition satisfies the axioms of a coalgebra: that is, that

Indeed, one gets

and likewise for the other side. However, it is insightful to provide explicit expressions.

Expanding, one has

In the above expansion, there is no need to ever write  as this is just plain-old scalar multiplication in the algebra; that is, one trivially has that 

The extension above preserves the algebra grading. That is,

Continuing in this fashion, one can obtain an explicit expression for the coproduct acting on a homogenous element of order m:

where the  symbol, which should appear as ш, the sha, denotes the shuffle product. This is expressed in the second summation, which is taken over all (p, m − p)-shuffles. The shuffle is

By convention, one takes that Sh(m,0) and Sh(0,m) equals {id: {1, ..., m} → {1, ..., m}}. It is also convenient to take the pure tensor products  and 
to equal 1 for p = 0 and p = m, respectively (the empty product in ). The shuffle follows directly from the first axiom of a co-algebra: the relative order of the elements  is preserved in the riffle shuffle: the riffle shuffle merely splits the ordered sequence into two ordered sequences, one on the left, and one on the right.

Equivalently,

As before, the algebra grading is preserved:

Counit
The counit  is given by the projection of the field component out from the algebra. By homomorphism under the tensor product , this extends to 

for all 
It is a straightforward matter to verify that this counit satisfies the needed axiom for the coalgebra:

Working this explicitly, one has

where, for the last step, one has made use of the isomorphism , as is appropriate for the defining axiom of the counit.

Bialgebra
A bialgebra defines both multiplication, and comultiplication, and requires them to be compatible.

Multiplication 
Multiplication is given by an operator

which, in this case, was already given as the "internal" tensor product. That is,

To strengthen this: the tensor product  of the tensor algebra corresponds to the multiplication  used in the definition of an algebra, whereas the tensor product  is the one required in the definition of comultiplication in a coalgebra. These two tensor products are not the same thing!

Unit 
The unit for the algebra

is just the embedding, so that

That the unit is compatible with the tensor product  is "trivial": it is just part of the standard definition of the tensor product of vector spaces.  That is,  for field element k and any   More verbosely, the axioms for an associative algebra require the two homomorphisms (or commuting diagrams):

where the right-hand side of these equations should be understood as the scalar product.

Compatibility 
The unit and counit, and multiplication and comultiplication, all have to satisfy compatibility conditions. It is straightforward to see that 

Similarly, the unit is compatible with comultiplication:

The above requires the use of the isomorphism  in order to work; without this, one loses linearity. Component-wise,

with the right-hand side making use of the isomorphism.

Multiplication and the counit are compatible:

where  exchanges elements.

For  an explicit expression for this was given in the coalgebra section, above.

Hopf algebra
The Hopf algebra adds an antipode to the bialgebra axioms.

This is sometimes called the "anti-identity".

This extends homomorphically to

Compatibility 
Compatibility of the antipode with multiplication and comultiplication requires that

This is straightforward to verify componentwise on :

Similarly, on :

Recall that

and that 

for any  that is not in 

Cofree cocomplete coalgebra

One may define a different coproduct on the tensor algebra, simpler than the one given above.  It is given by

Here, as before, one uses the notational trick  (recalling that  trivially).

This coproduct gives rise to a coalgebra. It describes a coalgebra that is dual to the algebra structure on T(V∗), where V∗ denotes the dual vector space of linear maps V → F. In the same way that the tensor algebra is a free algebra, the corresponding coalgebra is termed cocomplete co-free. With the usual product this is not a bialgebra. This bialgebra is known as the divided power Hopf algebra.

The difference between this, and the other coalgebra is most easily seen in the  term.  Here, one has that

See also
Braided vector space
Braided Hopf algebra
Monoidal category
Multilinear algebra
Stanisław Lem's Love and Tensor Algebra
Fock space

References
 (See Chapter 3 §5)

 

Algebras
Multilinear algebra
Tensors
Hopf algebras